Ljubiša Rajić (Belgrade, 4 April 1947 – Belgrade, 4 June 2012) was a Serbian university professor of North Germanic languages, prolific translator and academic.

Biography 
He graduated North Germanic languages in 1975 in Oslo, and went on the get a master's degrees and a PhD at Faculty of Philology in Belgrade.

Rajić is the founder of North Germanic languages department at the University of Belgrade.

He died at the age of 65 in Belgrade after a long illness.

Scientific work 
As one of the most prolific authors and scholars in the area of North Germanic languages, Rajić authored more than 200 scientific papers and peer reviews as well as around 500 articles. The current system of transcription from North Germanic languages to Serbian was written by Rajić and published under Matica Srpska in 2010.

Awards and legacy 
Ljubiša Rajić Award was established in his honour. It is given every two years on the International student day and Rajićs birthday (4 April). The award is given for the first translation of prose or poetry from a foreign language.

Rajić was a foreign member of Norwegian Academy of Science and Letters.

His decorations include:

 – Knight (Chevalier) of the White Rose of Finland
 – Commander 1st Class of the Order of the Polar Star, Sweden
 – St. Olav's Medal, Norway
 – Royal Norwegian Order of Merit

Selected works 
Švedska gramatika = Svensk grammatik pa serbokroatiska, 1985
Objašnjenje u istorijskoj lingvistici, 1991
Skandinavske književnosti u prevodu na srpskohrvatski jezik: građa za bibliografiju, 1997
Tekst u vremenu, 2008.
Umeće čitanja: ogledi o (književnom) tekstu, 2009
Dnevnik iz Beograda, autobiographical prose dealing with the events during NATO bombing of Yugoslavia

Translations
Generacija by Georg Johannesen, 1971
Savremena norveška lirika, with Desanka Maksimović, 1978
Kada se jedan mali narod bori za život : srpske vojničke priče by Obrest H. Angel, 1995
Pan by Knut Hamsun, 1995
Karius and Bactus by Thorbjørn Egner, 1995
Sophie's World by Jostein Gaarder, 1998
The Solitaire Mystery by Jostein Gaarder, 1998
Through a Glass, Darkly by Jostein Gaarder, 2001
Maya by Jostein Gaarder, 2002
The Ringmaster's Daughter by Jostein Gaarder, 2002
The Castle in the Pyrenees  by Jostein Gaarder, 2009
A Philosophy of Fear by Lars Svendsen, 2008
Dramas I-II by Henrik Ibsen, 2014

References 

Serbian translators
Serbian philologists
20th-century translators
20th-century philologists
21st-century translators
21st-century philologists
University of Oslo alumni
Serbian expatriates in Norway
University of Belgrade Faculty of Philology alumni
Academic staff of the University of Belgrade
Commanders of the Order of the Polar Star
1947 births
2012 deaths
Members of the Norwegian Academy of Science and Letters